Films produced in Spain in the 1980s ordered by year of release on separate pages:

List of films by year
Spanish films of 1980
Spanish films of 1981
Spanish films of 1982
Spanish films of 1983
Spanish films of 1984
Spanish films of 1985
Spanish films of 1986
Spanish films of 1987
Spanish films of 1988
Spanish films of 1989

External links
 Spanish film at the Internet Movie Database

Spanish
Films